Sir Roger Owen (1573 – 29 May 1617) was an English Member of Parliament. He was the eldest son of Thomas Owen of Condover, Shropshire and was educated at Shrewsbury School (1583) and Christ Church, Oxford (awarded B.A. 1592). He trained for the law at Lincoln's Inn (1589) and was called to the bar in 1597. In 1598 he succeeded his father, who had built Condover Hall for him, and was knighted in 1604.

Offices held
He was appointed a Justice of the Peace for Shropshire by 1601 to 1614, High Sheriff of Shropshire for 1603–1604 and a member of the Council in the Marches of Wales for 1602–1607. He was knighted in 1604.

He was a bencher at Lincoln's Inn in 1611 and treasurer in 1612–1613. He was elected a Member (MP) of the Parliament of England for Shrewsbury in 1597 and for Shropshire in 1601, 1606 and 1614.

Death
He died intestate in London in 1617 and was buried at Condover.

Family
He had married his step-sister Ursula, the daughter of William Elkin, alderman of London, and of his wife Alice (daughter of Thomas Wilkes, brewer of London, and also widow of another brewer, Henry Robinson. They had 2 daughters.

References

 

1573 births
1617 deaths
People educated at Shrewsbury School
Alumni of Christ Church, Oxford
High Sheriffs of Shropshire
English MPs 1597–1598
English MPs 1601
English MPs 1604–1611
English MPs 1614